Heloísa Maria Buarque de Hollanda (30 November 1937 – 27 December 2018), whose artistic name was Miúcha, was a Brazilian singer and composer.

Life and career 
Heloisa Maria Buarque de Hollanda was born in Rio de Janeiro.

When she was 8 years old her family moved to São Paulo. As a child she formed a vocal ensemble with her siblings, including Chico Buarque. In 1960 she moved to Paris where she studied Art History at the École du Louvre.

In 1975, she recorded professionally for the first time singing on the album The Best of Two Worlds in partnership with João Gilberto and Stan Getz. After this release, Miúcha partnered with Tom Jobim on two albums, 1977 and 1979, and was part of the show organized by Aloysio de Oliveira along with Vinicius de Moraes, Tom Jobim and Toquinho. The act was shown for a year at Canecão in  Rio de Janeiro, followed for international presentations in South America and Europe, and gave origin to the recording Tom, Vinícius, Toquinho e Miúcha recorded live in Canecão (RCA Victor, 1977)

Personal life 
In 1963, Miúcha made a holiday trip with friends to Greece, Italy and France. In Paris, in the bar La Candelaria, she met the Chilean singer Violeta Parra, through whom she met singer João Gilberto. Miúcha and Gilberto married in 1965 and had a daughter, Bebel Gilberto, in 1966.

Miúcha died on 27 December 2018, in Rio de Janeiro, at the age of 81.

Discography
 The Best of Two Worlds (1976) Columbia LP
 Miúcha & Antônio Carlos Jobim (1977) RCA Victor LP
 Tom/Vinicius/Toquinho/Miúcha''' - Gravado ao vivo no Canecão (1977) Som Livre LP, CD
 Miúcha & Tom Jobim (1979) RCA Victor LP
 Miúcha (1980) RCA Victor LP
 Miúcha' (1989) Warner/Continental LP
 Vivendo Vinicius ao vivo Baden Powell, Carlos Lyra, Miúcha e Toquinho (1999) BMG Brasil CD
 Rosa amarela (1999) BMG Brasil CD
 Miúcha.compositores (2002) Biscoito Fino CD
 Miúcha canta Vinicius & Vinicius - Música e letra (2003) Biscoito Fino CD
 Outros Sonhos (2007) Biscoito Fino CD
 Miucha com Tom, Vinicius e Joao'' (2008) Sony CD

References

1937 births
2018 deaths
Bossa nova singers
Brazilian women composers
Musicians from Rio de Janeiro (city)
20th-century Brazilian women singers
20th-century Brazilian singers
21st-century Brazilian women singers
21st-century Brazilian singers
20th-century women composers
21st-century women composers
Women in Latin music